Emílio Vitalino Santiago (6 December 1946 – 20 March 2013), known as Emílio Santiago, was a Brazilian singer.

Biography

Early years
Attending college at Federal University of Rio de Janeiro Law School in the 1970s, where he graduated at the insistence of parents, began to sing in college festivals this same decade and participated in a program, reaching a final program Flávio Cavalcanti, in defunct TV Tupi. He worked as a crooner at Ed Lincoln orchestra, and many performances in nightclubs and concert halls nightly.

Music career
In 1973 he released the first single for Polydor Records, with songs "Transa de amor" and "Saravá Nega", which caused major interests in radio and television programs.

The first record was released by CID in 1975, with forgotten songs of enshrined composers as Ivan Lins, João Donato, Jorge Benjor, Nelson Cavaquinho, Guilherme de Brito, Marcos Valle and Paulo Sergio, among others. He moved the following year to the Philips/Polygram, staying on this label until 1984, by which released ten albums – all with little effect. In 1985, he was chosen as the best performer in the "Festival of Festivals", TV Globo with the song "Elis, Elis".

His success actually came in 1988, when he released the LP Brazilian "Aquarela Brasileira" (Brazilian Watercolor) by Som Livre, a special project of seven volumes devoted exclusively to the repertoire of Brazilian music, the project surpassed four million copies sold. At that time, also released other special projects, as a tribute to singer Dick Farney ("Perdido de Amor" (Lost Love), 1995) or rewriting classics of Hispanic Bolero ("Dias de Luna", 1996).

In 2000, he signed with Sony Music. The album that marks the debut on the new label is "Bossa Nova", which brought many classics of the genre and also yielded a DVD. Continued with a "Um sorriso nos lábios" (2001), a tribute to Gonzaguinha and another to João Donato in 2003.

His latest album was "O melhor das aquarelas ao vivo" (The best of watercolors live) where he revised the repertoire of Brazilian music that he recorded since the album " Aquarela Brasileira" (Brazilian Watercolour (1988). That was the first live album and second DVD of Emilio's career after "Bossa Nova" (2000).

Death
Santiago suffered a stroke on March 7, 2013. At first he seemed to be responding to treatment, but his health worsened and on 20 March 2013, at 6:30 in the morning, the singer died at the age of 66 in Samaritan Hospital, Rio de Janeiro. Emílio Santiago, was veiled at the Rio de Janeiro Chamber of Councilors and buried in the Memorial do Carmo, Rio de Janeiro, Caju, Brazil. (Port Area of Rio de Janeiro)

Discography
 1975 – Emílio Santiago
 1976 – Brasileiríssimas
 1977 – Comigo é assim
 1977 – Feito pra ouvir
 1978 – Emílio
 1979 – O canto crescente de Emílio Santiago
 1980 – Guerreiro coração
 1981 – Amor de lua
 1982 – Ensaios de amor
 1983 – Mais que um momento
 1984 – Tá na hora
 1988 – Aquarela Brasileira
 1989 – Aquarela Brasileira 2
 1990 – Aquarela Brasileira 3
 1991 – Aquarela Brasileira 4
 1992 – Aquarela Brasileira 5
 1993 – Aquarela Brasileira 6
 1995 – Aquarela Brasileira 7
 1995 – Perdido de amor
 1996 – Dias de luna
 1997 – Emílio Santiago
 1998 – Emílio Santiago
 1998 – Preciso dizer que te amo
 2000 – Bossa nova
 2001 – Um sorriso nos lábios
 2003 – Emílio Santiago encontra João Donato
 2005 – O melhor das Aquarelas – ao vivo
 2007 – De um jeito diferente
 2010 – Só Danço Samba
 2011 – Personalidade

References

External links

Profile in Portuguese 

1946 births
2013 deaths
Musicians from Rio de Janeiro (city)
Federal University of Rio de Janeiro alumni
LGBT Christians
Brazilian LGBT singers
20th-century Brazilian male singers
20th-century Brazilian singers
21st-century Brazilian male singers
21st-century Brazilian singers
LGBT Afro-Brazilians
LGBT people in Latin music